Mutter is a window manager initially designed and implemented for the X Window System, but then evolved to be a Wayland compositor. It became the default window manager in GNOME 3, replacing Metacity which used GTK for rendering.

Window management 
Mutter uses a graphics library called Clutter giving it OpenGL capability. Mutter is a portmanteau of Metacity and Clutter. Mutter can function as a standalone window manager for GNOME-like desktops, and serves as the primary window manager for the GNOME Shell, which is an integral part of GNOME 3. Mutter is extensible with plug-ins, and supports numerous visual effects. GNOME Shell is written as a plug-in to Mutter.

Release history 
Support for HiDPI was added to version 3.13 of Mutter by Adel Gadllah.

In version 3.13.2 logind integration replaced mutter-launch.

In version 3.13.3 (June 24, 2014) the server side bits of wl_touch_interface were implemented by Carlos Garnacho.

Forks

Muffin 
Muffin is a fork of Mutter by the Linux Mint team for their Cinnamon desktop environment. Cinnamon's shell, a fork of GNOME Shell, is written as a plugin for Muffin.

References

Further reading

External links
 Mutter tarballs
 mutter-wayland tarballs
 GNOME git: Mutter
 GNOME Wiki: Mutter Gestures

Compositing window managers
Free software programmed in C
Free X window managers
GNOME
Linux windowing system-related software
Software that uses Clutter (software)
Wayland compositors
Window managers that use GTK